Since 2012, various jurisdictions in the United States have legalized cannabis for recreational use. Because there are no border controls between U.S. states and citizens are allowed to travel freely between them, this has resulted in the proliferation of cannabis dispensaries located in towns that border states where cannabis remains illegal. These dispensaries can often be a significant source of revenue for the local economy of a city; for example, the city of Ontario, Oregon generated $100 million in cannabis sales less than two years after allowing dispensaries. 

This article lists cities and towns throughout the United States located at or near a state line that have at least one cannabis dispensary.

Border towns with cannabis dispensaries in the United States

Antonito, Colorado
Located just north of the New Mexico border, Antonito's authorization of retail marijuana shops resulted in a $295,000 annual increase in the city budget. The money has been used to pay for critical services and purchase the 106-year-old Warshauer Mansion for use as a future City Hall.

Danville, Illinois
Located in eastern Illinois on the Indiana state line, Danville's first cannabis dispensary opened in May 2020.

Dinosaur, Colorado
A town of less than 400 people, Dinosaur voted 102-50 to allow marijuana dispensaries in 2016 and serves residents of Utah.

Iron Mountain, Michigan
Located in the Upper Peninsula of Michigan along the Wisconsin border, Iron Mountain's first recreational dispensary opened in October 2020.

Morenci, Michigan
Located along the Ohio border, the city of Morenci's dispensaries serve both recreational customers and Ohio medical cannabis patients who exhaust their legal supply in Ohio before purchasing more in Michigan.

Ontario, Oregon
Ontario, Oregon repealed its ban on cannabis dispensaries in the November 2018 general election. Dispensaries opened in the town the following year and immediately saw a large influx of Idaho residents. Tax revenue from the dispensaries has enabled Ontario to expand its city budget and cease cutting funds for general services in the city.

Quincy, Illinois
Located on the western Illinois state line directly across the border from Missouri, Quincy's dispensaries have been in operation since January 2020.

Salisbury, Massachusetts

A resort town on the New Hampshire border. Police in nearby Seabrook, New Hampshire regularly confiscate cannabis purchased in Salisbury by residents.

Sedgwick, Colorado
Located in northeastern Colorado near the Nebraska border, Sedgwick's cannabis dispensaries were a major benefit to the small town's economy. However, the town has also drawn the ire of Nebraska law enforcement officials, who believe it is to blame for the large spike in marijuana possession arrests in Nebraska-Colorado border towns since legalization.

South Beloit, Illinois
Located across the border from Beloit, Wisconsin, South Beloit's first cannabis dispensary opened in 2020 following the legalization of cannabis in Illinois and has generated significant tax revenue for the city.

Trinidad, Colorado
One of the first cannabis border towns, Trinidad's economy was revitalized by the legalization of marijuana due to its close proximity to both New Mexico and Texas.

Uxbridge, Massachusetts
Located on the border with Rhode Island, Uxbridge has several marijuana dispensaries. As of September 2019, the city is considering establishing marijuana smoking clubs in the city.

West Wendover, Nevada
Located across the border from Wendover, Utah, West Wendover's first dispensary opened in December 2019 and serves Utah residents in the western half of the state.

Previously used border town dispensaries
From July 2014 to October 2015, recreational cannabis sales were legal in Washington but illegal in Oregon; accordingly, Washington-based dispensaries located along the Oregon-Washington border made considerable revenue from Oregon residents during this time. However, after Oregon began recreational cannabis sales in October 2015, revenue at state line dispensaries plummeted as Oregon residents switched to dispensaries in their own state.

Huntington, Oregon was the primary city used by Idaho residents to purchase cannabis until 2019, when the city of Ontario (which is located closer to the Idaho border) opened its own dispensaries; cannabis sales subsequently declined significantly in Huntington.

See also
 Border effect
 Cannabis in the United States
 Legality of cannabis by U.S. jurisdiction
 Legal history of cannabis in the United States
 Whiteclay, Nebraska

References

Cannabis in the United States